Yandex Music ( tr. Yandeks Muzyka; stylised as Yandex.Music) is a Russian music streaming service developed by Yandex. Users select musical compositions, albums, collections of musical tracks to stream to their device on demand and receive personalized recommendations. The service is also available as web browser.  Service is available in Armenia, Azerbaijan, Belarus, Georgia, Israel, Kazakhstan, Kyrgyzstan, Moldova, Russia, Tajikistan, Turkmenistan and Uzbekistan. Subscription can only be paid from supported countries above, but the service is then available in all other countries.

As of October 2017, over 40 million music tracks were available on Yandex Music. About 20 million people use the service at least once a month.

The most popular feature of Yandex Music is the smart playlists, which is updated daily for each user and features recently played tracks, similar music to their favorites, and diverse tracks that are based on user's tastes.

User options 

 Music on demand;
 Personal recommendations;
 Directory search and category structuring;
 Making playlists and transferring them between accounts and devices;
 Offline playback of downloaded tracks (paid subscription only);
 Saving music in personal library;
 Streaming video;
 Adding tracks to blogs and web-sites;
 Scrobbling - transfer of information about the streamed tracks to the Last.fm site for later use;
 Import of music from Last.fm and Deezer;
 Search for music by text and text "tunes";
 Buying concert tickets;
 Lyrics and literary translations of foreign song lyrics;
 Music selections by the editorial staff, by brands, media, musicians, bloggers, labels, etc.;
 Notifications of new compositions by favorite artists;
 Gift subscriptions for 3, 6 or 12 months;
 Maximum bitrate playback up to 320 kbit/s and the sampling frequency of 44.1 kHz, 16-bit, stereo;

High quality HQ sound mode is available for users with paid subscriptions.

History 

On September 22, 2010, Yandex announced the launch of a separate service, Yandex Music, which allowed streaming of songs, albums and collections of various artists to user device on demand. More than 50 rightholders provided content for the service, including Universal, EMI, Warner Music Group, Sony Music, First Music Publishing, Monolit, SBA Production etc.

800 thousand tracks by 58 thousand artists were available in the catalogue at the time of launch.

On May 30, 2012, Yandex released the Yandex Music application for iOS.

In May 2013, the Yandex Music application for Android was released.

In September 2014, Yandex started using the system of personal recommendations. Playlist forming became sensitive to the personal musical preferences of the user and his friends on Vkontakte and Facebook. The interface also changed significantly.

In October 2017, Yandex made a complete redesign of the service. The sections "New Releases", "Playlists with New Compositions", "Mood and Genres" and "Charts" were added to the main page. The player and the artist screen  also changed.

In June 2018, Yandex Music was launched in Armenia. By the time of the launch, the interface was translated into Armenian, the service’s editorial team prepared playlists with Armenian music, and daily updated charts with tracks popular in Armenia appeared on the main page.

In October 2018, Yandex Music was launched in Israel. The catalog has been updated. Popular local artist have been added. The search started to understand queries in English and Hebrew.

Technologies 
To form personal recommendations, the service uses artificial neural networks. Algorithms developed on the basis of the neural networks and similar developments of other companies allow computers to better understand how music works and to learn to perceive it in the same way as a person does.

References

Yandex
Music streaming services